Half Moon Point is the northernmost point of mainland Jamaica.  It is named for the resort on whose property it sits.  Immediately to its west is Half Moon Bay, and a little to its east is Rose Hall.

See also
List of countries by northernmost point

External links
Aerial view
Photos:

References

Headlands of Jamaica
Extreme points of Jamaica
Geography of Saint James Parish, Jamaica